Andreas Preschel (born 1 February 1961) is an East German judoka who competed for the SC Dynamo Berlin / Sportvereinigung (SV) Dynamo. He won the 1983 World Championships in the weight class up to 95 kg.

References

External links
 

1961 births
Living people
German male judoka